Hang Dong is a tambon (subdistrict) of Hot District, in Chiang Mai Province, Thailand. In 2019 it had a total population of 10,525 people.

Administration

Central administration
The tambon is subdivided into 13 administrative villages (muban).

Local administration
The area of the subdistrict is shared by 2 local governments.
the subdistrict municipality (Thesaban Tambon) Tha Kham (เทศบาลตำบลท่าข้าม)
the subdistrict administrative organization (SAO) Hang Dong (องค์การบริหารส่วนตำบลหางดง)

References

External links
Thaitambon.com on Hang Dong

Tambon of Chiang Mai province
Populated places in Chiang Mai province